Digital identity is used in Australia by residents to validate who they are over digital media, such as over the Internet.

While many organisations use their own mechanisms, increasingly, aggregated digital identities are in use.  Many Australian organisations leverage popular ubiquitous Internet identities such as those provided by social login services including Facebook, Google, Twitter and LinkedIn to perform the following functions:

 Single sign-on to help users avoiding creating new user names and passwords for each site.
 To provide some basic validation of identity
 To provide some integration, especially with social media, e-mail and contacts
 To identify the natural person behind a transaction for statutory purposes such as a monetary transfer

In addition to these services, in order to validate identities in Australia additional services are used, such as government, and bank digital identities.

SIM as digital identity
The use of a mobile phone SIM as a digital identity in Australia provides some level of validation of the digital identity of the holder.  Validation of the holder can be done by sending them an SMS to their phone number.  The advantage of this mechanism is:

 SIMs are generally unique
 The mobile phone number is known to the holder, and often the trusting organisation, and used as the contact of the customer
 The mobile phone generally is carried by the person wherever they go
 There is a high penetration of mobile phones in Australia, in 2015 covering almost 80% of individuals
 There are some identity requirements in obtaining a SIM, so there can be a level of certainty that the holder is a known natural person, and resident (or temporary resident) of Australia even if the plan is Prepaid

For this reason the mobile phone is often used as a primary or second-factor validation of identity on Australian digital services.

myGov

myGov is a service provided by the Government of Australia that provides a strong level of validation of digital identity.  It is used primarily for government (including some state government) and semi-government services such as:

 Centrelink for social welfare applications and payments
 Medicare for health care
 Australian Taxation Office to enable online tax returns
 Child Support
 Victorian Housing Register
 My Health Record for Electronic Health Records
 National Disability Insurance Scheme
 My Aged Care
 Department of Veterans Affairs' online facilities
 Australian Job Search (government job search network)

myGov also integrates with Australia Post MyPost Digital Mailbox to facilitate secure electronic document delivery, as most government departments avoid the use of e-mail to directly deliver private documents.

myGov logins also support a number of other login services, especially in government.

A myGov account can be created without the use of identity documentation, so it is possible to create an account without a valid natural person.  However, as services are added, access to private information, such as documents or identity that should only be known by the individual concerned, is required, making the identity stronger.  Many services require a second factor of authentication – SMS via a SIM-based mobile phone number as mentioned above.

myGovID

Separate from myGov, myGovID is a digital ID component, that allows a form of multi-factor authentication to government websites through a mobile app. A user attempts a login online using their email, a pin is generated, and the user types the online pin into their mobile app, and online login can be completed.

The myGovID application supports government departments building their own websites, and does not require the single portal access of myGov.

Australia Post Digital iD
Digital iD by Australia Post is a smart phone based app that allows users to create and validate their ID against the Australian Government Document Verification Service (DVS) and then use it as a primary ID system online and in person.

Users can use their Passports, Drivers Licenses or Medicare Card to assert and confirm ID online. A photo is taken, and head movement is detected to ensure the holder is real and their face matches. Your passport can be scanned using the phone's near-field communication (NFC) reader and used to assert biometrics. The user's image with dynamic security features, and an updating QR code are then displayed to people to verify the ID. The date of birth and full name are displayed on the app. Australia Post claims it is acceptable for use to validate the holder's identity. It can be used instead of KeyPass for holders 18 years and older. 

The Digital iD website states that it is used by over 50 government and private organisations across a variety of industries and sectors. Launched in 2016, questions were raised as to longevity of the offering after the founder quit, however, continued investment from Australia Post has seen Digital iD become the first industry provider accredited under the federal government’s Trusted Digital Identity Framework (TDIF). Usage of Digital iD is growing, and Keypass in Digital iD is now accepted as proof of age to enter participating licensed venues and to purchase alcohol in Vic, Tas, Qld, ACT and NT (excluding takeaway alcohol in NT).

Online banking
Online banking in Australia requires digital identification.  As in other jurisdictions, access to bank accounts statements and making payments are the primary services available.  In addition to these, it is possible to access documents (almost exclusively bills) from other corporations online using BPAY View.  Over 300 billers are supported via this mechanism.

For some transactions multi-factor authentication is required. Normally this is a password in combination with a code sent via SMS or in some cases, especially for business customers, a bank-issued security token.

Most online banking services, especially if accessing an account requires the holder to complete stringent identity requirements sometimes in a bank branch.  This ensures the quality of the identity.

The four major online banking sites in Australia are:
 ANZ Bank
 Commonwealth Bank
 National Australia Bank
 Westpac

State government services
Some states and territories of Australia offer access points to government services in those states, and require a digital identity to access these services.

Service NSW is an example – an account can be created without any verifiable identity, however as services (such as Transport for NSW) are added, private details need to be accessible, increasing the validity of the identity.

The South Australian government has made several digital licences available via the mySA GOV app (Driver's licence, Proof of Age Card etc).

NSW also provides some licences online.

As at 2020, Queensland's Department of Transport & Main Roads was trailing a digital license in the Fraser Coast Region.

Tax file number

The Australian Tax file number (TFN) is a 9 digit identity document issued to tax payers.  There is no card or official identity document in popular use that shows this number and strict rules on its use means that it is not required to be provided, and there is no practical way a non government entity to verify the holder against the number.  It is therefore not an effective widespread digital identity (unlike the US Social Security number).  However it is used to digitally identify tax paying entities behind transactions via financial institutions when the number has been disclosed.  Failure to disclose the tax file number can draw attention to the transaction and/or result in tax being withheld, so it is used for specific purposes.

Digital identity verification services
Identity and associated information can be verified a number of ways:

 The Australian Attorney-General's Department provides a Document Verification Service (DVS) that allows for validation of some licences.
 The Australian Attorney-General's Department also provides a bio-metric face verification service
Visas, identity, and right to work status can be checked online through the Department of Immigration and Border Protection's Visa Entitlement Verification Online (VEVO) service.
 Some States and territories allow for drivers licences, photo cards and certificates to be validated online e.g. NSW and Victoria.
 Electoral enrollment can be verified electronically, and may help to verify an identity.
 Private companies offer aggregated online identity checking services e.g. Vix Verify and Equifax
 In addition, certain aspects of individuals can be verified digitally - online, such as:
 Working With Children Check to ensure that an individual has cleared the necessary background checks to allow them to work with children. To apply for a check the applicant must physically attend an agency, however the employer can verify the check online, for the duration of employment.
 Australian Criminal Intelligence Commission ACIC allows organisations to provide National Police History Check certificates on ACIC's behalf.  Some of these can be obtained online (such as Veritas), and later verified online.
 Some institutions allow the online verification of education qualifications.

See also
Identity documents of Australia

References

External links
 myGov Australian Government login
 Service NSW Home page
 MyPost Digital Mailbox - Australia Post
 DVS - Australian Government Document Verification Service

Identity documents of Australia
E-government in Australia